Charles Franklin Sparrell was born in Boston, Massachusetts in 1852 and died in Newport, Kentucky in 1934. His father was John Turner Sparrell, Jr., a marble worker, and farmer. His mother was Elizabeth Ann (Provoost) Sparrell. He was the most influential architect in the city of Columbus, Indiana in the late 19th century.  When he arrived in the city in the early 1880s he was credited as having attended an "institute of technology" in Massachusetts, but Massachusetts Institute of Technology does not list him as an alumnus.  More than 10 of his buildings remain in the city, many of which are on the National Register of Historic Places listings in Bartholomew County, Indiana.

Architectural career
Before starting his own practice, he worked for Hege and Company Contracting as a shop foreman.  His own offices were located on 330, 332, and 334 Fifth Street and his employees included Georgia Wills, a woman who worked for him as an assistant draftsman.

Among his most notable buildings are the Columbus City Hall and the Maple Grove School.

Columbus City Hall was completed in 1895 and remains at 445 Fifth Street.  Today it is operated as an apartment complex.   This brick romanesque revival building features a tall, square bell tower and limestone detailing.  When first opened it contained the police station and the jail. It also had a banquet hall, a dance hall, a basketball court, and an exhibit area. A farmers market operated out of the basement that opened to the public on the west side of the street.

While the Maple Grove School has been home to a variety of organizations and was quickly renamed the Garfield Elementary School, it was built in 1896 as a four classroom school house.  In the late 1980s Arvin Industries renovated and expanded the building to serve as the company's headquarters.  Today it serves as the administrative building for the Bartholomew Consolidated School Corporation.

List of buildings designed by Sparrell

It is not clear if the former A. J. Banker's Hospital or Reeves Pulley Company were designed by Sparrell; only one published source indicates he designed these buildings.

References

External links

Historical Columbus Indiana
Charles Sparrell's architectural legacy in Columbus, Indiana
Timeline of Columbus History by Ricky Berkey

1852 births
1934 deaths
Architects from Indiana
Architects from Boston
People from Columbus, Indiana
People from Newport, Kentucky